Ortlieb may refer to:

Given name
Ortlieb, minor figure in Germanic heroic legend
Ortlieb of Strasbourg (fl. 12th–13th century), German theologian
Ortlieb of Zwiefalten (d. 1164), German historian

Surname
Alfred Ortlieb (b. 1888), French cinematographer
Nina Ortlieb (b. 1996), Austrian skier
Patrick Ortlieb (b. 1967), Austrian skier
Robert Ortlieb (1924–2011), American sculptor

Other
Ortlieb Sportartikel, German manufacturer of outdoor equipment